The Toro Rosso STR7, initially referred to as the TR7, is a Formula One racing car designed by Scuderia Toro Rosso for use in the 2012 FIA Formula One World Championship. It was the seventh car run by the team, and the third car that they had developed since the introduction of rules in  prohibiting teams from using a "customer chassis", or a design that had previously been used by another team. The car was driven by Daniel Ricciardo and Jean-Éric Vergne, after the team elected not to renew the contracts of former drivers Sébastien Buemi and Jaime Alguersuari, and was launched on 7 February 2012 at the first winter test of the season at Jerez de la Frontera.

Season review
The car proved promising in the first 2 races as Ricciardo and Vergne scored points each in those races. However afterwards the car struggled for competitiveness as both drivers finished outside the points scoring positions. Upgrades were fitted onto their cars when they head for the Belgian GP. Since then, both drivers consistently scored points and the car showed improvements. They eventually finished the season in 9th place with 26 points with the best result of 8th place on 4 occasions where Vergne achieved all the points he had managed to get while finishing in that position .

Notes

Complete Formula One results
(key) (results in bold indicate pole position; results in italics indicate fastest lap)

References

External links

Toro Rosso STR7